Ferdowsi Metro Station is a station in Tehran Metro Line 4. It is located in Ferdowsi Square the junction of Enghelab Street and Ferdowsi Street. It is between Darvaze Dolat Metro Station and Teatr-e Shahr Metro Station. It has connection to Tehran Bus BRT1.

References

Tehran Metro stations